Wazirabad Junction railway station (Urdu) is located in Wazirabad city, Wazirabad District of Punjab province of the Pakistan.

See also
 List of railway stations in Pakistan
 Pakistan Railways

Services

Trains that pass via Karachi - Peshawar Line

Trains that pass via branch lines

References

External links
 Official Web Site of Pakistan Railways

Wazirabad District
Railway stations on Wazirabad–Narowal Branch Line
Railway stations on Khanewal–Wazirabad Line
Railway stations on Karachi–Peshawar Line (ML 1)